Vishwanath Kashinath Rajwade (24 July 1863 – 31 December 1926), popularly known as Itihasacharya Rajwade, was a historian, scholar, writer, commentator and orator from Maharashtra, India. He is considered to be the first in real sense to undertake an immense research of Maratha history by visiting hundreds of villages and historical places all over India and gathering thousands of historical papers. He was also a commentator on various aspects of world history. He was the founder member of Itihas Sanshodhak Mandal, Pune. His students include historians like Datto Vaman Potdar, Vasudeo Sitaram Bendrey and G. H. Khare.

The historian, Ram Sharan Sharma says: "With his unadulterated passion for research, V.K.Rajwade went from village to village in Maharashtra in search of Sanskrit manuscripts and sources of Maratha history; which were published in twenty-two volumes."

Rajwade should not be confused with "Ahitagni" Shankar Ramchandra Rajwade, the Vedic scholar.

The Indian History Congress has constituted the Vishwanath Kashinath Rajwade Award for lifelong service and contribution to Indian history.

Early life
Rajwade was born in a Chitpavan Brahmin family on 24 June 1863. Rajwade's grandfather was the Killedar of fort Lohagad in the province of Pune. He was born in Varsai village, in Raigad district, Maharashtra. His father died while he was a child and from then he was brought up by his uncle at Vadgaon near Pune. He matriculated in January 1882 and graduated in 1890 from Deccan College, Pune. During his degree course he came into close contact with eminent historian Ramkrishna Gopal Bhandarkar, who was then a professor at the college. He was also inspired by the works of Essayist Vishnushastri Krushnashastri Chiplunkar, lexicographer Parshuram Tatya Godbole and Kavyeitihas Sangrahakar Sane.

Later life

Rajwade married after graduating college but his wife died young. Thereafter he chose to remain single and dedicate his life to history and research. In 1895 he started a Marathi magazine called Bhashantar (meaning ‘translation’) through which he brought works of Western historians and scholars such as Plato, Aristotle, and Edward Gibbon, and also Indian scholars like Shankaracharya in Marathi. Simultaneously, by writing articles and delivering speeches he also started educating Marathi people on several subjects like history of Marathas, history of world, history of Marathi literature, grammar of Marathi and Sanskrit languages. In 1910, he founded Bharat Itihas Sanshodhak Mandal at Pune and kept all his works and historical papers gathered by him in the custody of the Mandal.

After his sudden death in 1926, ‘Rajwade Sanshodhak Mandal’ was founded at Dhule and his works and collection of his later life was kept there. Both  institutions have been contributing in the field of history and culture of India to this  date.

Works in Marathi as a researcher / historian / editor

Marathyanchya Itihasachi Sadhane (Sources of the History of Marathas) – 22 Volumes. He wrote the preface of each of 22 volume very scholarly.
Radha Madhav Vilas Champu (Biography of Shahaji)
Aitihasik Prastavana (Historical Prefaces)
Rajwade Lekhsangraha  (Collection of essays) – 3 Volumes
Bharatiya Vivah Sansthecha Itihas (History of Indian matrimony)
Dnyaneshwari  (Editor)
 Mahikavatichi Bakhar (chronicle of Mahikavati aka Mahim in present-day Mumbai)-detailed analysis & publication.

References

External links
 Historian V K Rajawade's works to hit the stands at www.indianexpress.com

 Dr. Jyotsna Kamat on V.K. Rajwade
 www.sahyadribooks.org Books of VK Rajwade are available on this web site

1863 births
1926 deaths
19th-century Indian historians
Marathi-language writers
20th-century Indian historians
People from Raigad district
People from Dhule district
People from Dhule
People from Maharashtra
Scientists from Maharashtra